Crkva Svetog Marka may refer to:

St. Mark's Church, Belgrade
St. Mark's Church, Zagreb